Interstate 75 (I-75) in the US state of Georgia travels north–south along the U.S. Route 41 (US 41) corridor in the central part of the state, traveling through the cities of Valdosta, Macon, and Atlanta. It is also designated—but not signed—as State Route 401 (SR 401).

I-75 is the only Interstate to traverse the full length of the state from north to south. In Downtown Atlanta, I-75 runs concurrently with I-85 as the Downtown Connector. The segment from SR 49 in Byron to I-16 in Macon is part of the Fall Line Freeway and may be incorporated into the eastern extension of I-14, which is currently entirely within Central Texas and is proposed to be extended to Augusta.

What would become the general routing of I-75 in Georgia was initially used by the western routing of the Dixie Highway beginning in 1916. Established in 1926, the Interstate's direct predecessor in Georgia is US 41, a national highway that has been largely supplanted in favor of the federally-funded freeway built under the Interstate Highway System—though limited-access elements of the Interstate existed as early as 1951.

Route description
It enters the state near Valdosta, and it continues northward through the towns of Tifton and Cordele until it reaches the Macon area, where it intersects with I-16 eastbound toward Savannah. For northbound traffic, I-475 provides a relatively straight bypass west of that city and I-75's route.

After Macon, I-75 passes the small town of Forsyth. The freeway reaches no major junctions again until in the Atlanta metropolitan area. The first metropolitan freeway met is I-675, then followed by the Atlanta "Perimeter" bypass, I-285. It crosses inside the Perimeter and heads north several miles toward the Atlanta city center. I-75 then runs concurrently with I-85 due north over the Downtown Connector through the central business district of Atlanta. The two Interstates intersect I-20 in downtown. Several miles north of the I-20 interchange, the two Interstates split, I-75 heads in a general northwest direction while I-85 heads northeast, crossing outside the I-285 Perimeter and heading toward the major suburban city of Marietta. This section of I-75 just north of I-285 has 16 through lanes, making it the widest roadway anywhere in the Interstate Highway System. North of Marietta, the final major junction in the Atlanta metropolitan area is the I-575 spur. I-75 then traverses the hilly North Georgia terrain as it travels toward Chattanooga, Tennessee.

The  section of I-75 from the northern I-475 intersection to the US 11/US 64 intersection in Ooltewah, Tennessee, is one of the longest continuous multi-state six-lane freeways in the US (some segments along this corridor have as many as 16 lanes).

Due to recent lane widening in southern Georgia completed in 2011, the only four-lane section of I-75 in Georgia is bypassed by six-lane I-475; along this route there are at least six lanes from the Alligator Alley portion of I-75 in Naples, Florida, to an portion of I-75 in Ooltewah (with the exception of a four-lane overpass on I-475 over a railroad track in Macon).

I-75 is the only Interstate to traverse the full length of the state from north to south. The entire length of I-75 in Georgia is part of the National Highway System, a system of routes determined to be the most important for the nation's economy, mobility, and defense.

History

Early national highways
The general routing of I-75 within Georgia was originally developed as the western routing of the Dixie Highway. The western route of the Dixie Highway as designated in 1916, followed present-day US 41 south from the Tennessee border through Atlanta and Macon south to Echeconnee, Georgia. The section that would become US 41, I-75's direct predecessor, from Echeconnee south through Perry and Valdosta to the border with Florida was paved beginning in 1919 and was later designated as a part of the Dixie Highway in 1924. In 1926, the western route of the Dixie Highway following the newer Perry and Valdosta route was officially designated as US 41. By October 1929, the majority of US 41 was paved in Georgia, the only sections that were not paved at that point were between Fort Oglethorpe and Ringgold, and another on the south side of Calhoun.

1950s
The highway that would eventually become I-75 in Georgia was an unnamed expressway that was open in 1951 from the southern part of Atlanta to University Avenue. It was projected from University Avenue to Williams Street in Downtown Atlanta. This expressway was open from Williams Street to what is now the northern end of the Downtown Connector. It was also proposed from the Downtown Connector to the northwest part of Atlanta. By late 1953, this expressway was signed as US 19/US 41 as far north as Lakewood Avenue. It was under construction from the Downtown Connector to Howell Mill Road. It was proposed from Howell Mill Road to the northwest part of Atlanta. By mid-1954, the expressway was signed as SR 295 from Lakewood Avenue to University Avenue. It was under construction from the Downtown Connector to US 41/SR 3E, just north of West Paces Ferry Road. By mid-1955, the highway was under construction from University Avenue to Glenn Street. It was open from Williams Street to US 41/SR 3E in the central part of Atlanta. By mid-1957, the highway was opened from University Avenue to Glenn Street. It was also open from Williams Street to US 41/SR 3E in the northwest part of Atlanta.

1960s
By the middle of 1960, a short segment southeast of Williams Street was open. By mid-1963, I-75 was signed. It was open from the Florida state line to US 41/SR 7 in Unadilla. It was under construction from Unadilla to just north of the Crawford–Bibb county line. It was open from SR 148 in Bolingbroke to US 23/SR 42 north-northwest of Forsyth. It was open from Glenn Street to Washington Street in Downtown Atlanta. It was under construction from US 41/SR 3 in the northwest part of Atlanta to its northern interchange with I-285. It was also under construction from SR 53 in Calhoun to the Tennessee state line. Between 1963 and 1965, it was open from US 41/SR 7 in Unadilla to Hartley Bridge Road south-southwest of Macon. It was proposed from Hartley Bridge Road to I-16 in Macon. It was under construction from I-16 to its northern interchange with I-475 near Bolingbroke. It was open from Bolingbroke to near Forsyth. It was under construction from there to SR 155 south of McDonough. It was proposed from there to SR 54 in Morrow. It was under construction from Morrow to US 19/US 41 west of Morrow. It was proposed from that interchange to SR 331 in Forest Park. It was open from Forest Park to West Paces Ferry Road in northwest Atlanta. It was under construction from there to SR 120 in Marietta. It was proposed from Marietta to SR 140 in Adairsville. It was under construction from Adairsville to SR 53 in Calhoun. It was open from Calhoun to the Tennessee state line. In 1966, the highway was open from the Florida state line to its southern interchange with I-475 near Macon. It was open from I-16 to US 23/SR 42 near Forsyth. It was open from Forest Park to its northern interchange with I-285. In 1967, it was under construction from US 80/SR 74 to I-16 in Macon. It was under construction from near Forsyth to the US 19/US 41 interchange west of Morrow. It was open from Forest Park to SR 120 in Marietta. It was under construction from SR 120 to Allgood Road in Marietta. In 1968, the highway was open US 23/SR 42 near Forsyth to SR 20 in McDonough. It was under construction from McDonough to SR 54 in Morrow. It was open from Morrow to Allgood Road in Marietta. It was under construction from US 411/SR 61 near Cartersville to SR 140 in Adairsville. In 1969, the highway was under construction from its southern interchange with I-475 to I-16 in Macon. It was open from I-16 to Allgood Road in Marietta.

1970s

In 1971, it was open from the Florida state line to Allgood Road in Marietta. In 1973, it was under construction from Marietta to SR 92 in Acworth. In 1974, the highway was under construction from Emerson to US 411/SR 61 near Cartersville. The last segment of I-75 in Georgia, located between Emerson and Cartersville, opened on December 21, 1977.

1980s

Much of the work to widen interstates across Atlanta including I-75 from six to eight lanes and the Downtown Connector to 10 lanes including the elimination of sharp curves and grades, left-hand exits, excessive interchanges, and short acceleration/deceleration lanes, took place in the 1980s. Construction began with widening I-285 first, beginning in 1976, continued to the radiating expressways, and concluded with the depressed sections of the Downtown Connector which were completed in 1988. I-75 widening from I-285 and Aviation Boulevard to the Downtown Connector was completed by late 1984. I-75 widening from the Brookwood Interchange to the Chattahoochee River and Cobb County line was widened in the early 1980s and completed by 1985. Work on the Downtown Connector portion began in 1984, and included redesigning the massive interchange between I-20 and I-75/I-85 and the design and construction of 55 bridges over the connector portion alone. The project was completed in November 1988.

After completion

In addition to the general-purpose lanes added in the 1980s, provisions for high-occupancy vehicle lanes (HOV lanes) and dedicated onramps at Williams Street, Piedmont Avenue, and Memorial Drive were built and were subsequently converted to HOV usage in 1996 on the Downtown Connector. In 1996, HOV lanes were also added from I-285 on the south side of Atlanta to I-285 on the north side of Atlanta.

In 1998, the portion of I-75 that from the Chattahoochee River north to the Tennessee state line was named the Larry McDonald Memorial Highway. Larry McDonald, a conservative Democratic representative to Congress, was aboard Korean Air Lines Flight 007 when it was shot down by the Soviet Union on September 1, 1983. He was the only sitting Congressperson to be reportedly killed by the Soviets during the Cold War. I-75 was also designated as the Horace E. Tate Freeway between I-85 to I-285 northwest of Downtown Atlanta, in honor of Horace Tate, who was a state senator in 1974.

Until 2000, the state of Georgia used the sequential interchange numbering system on all of its Interstate Highways. The first exit on each highway would begin with the number "1" and increase numerically with each exit. In 2000, the Georgia Department of Transportation (GDOT) switched to a mileage-based exit system, in which the exit number corresponded to the nearest milepost.

In March 2007, I-75's HOV ramp serving Northside Drive in Atlanta was the site of the Bluffton University bus crash where 7 out 35 people on board the bus were killed.

The highway had a lane widening project completed in 2011, allowing the entirety of the Interstate in Georgia to be three lanes in each direction. On January 28, 2017, the new Peach Pass-only South Metro Express Lanes from SR 155 to SR 138 and I-675, opened. On September 8, 2018, new Northwest Corridor Express Lanes from the I-285/I-75 interchange to Hickory Grove Road and from I-75/I-575 interchange to Sixes Road have opened, the lanes require a Peach Pass to use.

Future
The I-75/I-16 interchange is being revamped with extra ramps to and from US 23/US 129/SR 49. GDOT estimates that the final portion of the project will be bid on in 2023.

The segment of I-75 from SR 49 in Byron to I-16 in Macon is part of the Fall Line Freeway and may be incorporated into the eastern extension of I-14, which is currently entirely within Central Texas and is proposed to be extended to Augusta.

Exit list
Note: exit numbers along Georgia Interstates were renumbered in 1999 and 2000 to be mileage based instead of being sequential.

Related routes

There are three auxiliary Interstate Highways related to I-75 in Georgia and a fourth that was proposed. I-175 was a proposed spur from Albany northeast to Cordele. The road was built, but not as a freeway; it is SR 300, the Florida–Georgia Parkway. I-475 is a western bypass of Macon, shortening the trip for through I-75 traffic. I-575 is a spur from near Marietta north to Canton and Nelson, and I-675 is a cutoff from I-75 south of Atlanta north to I-285 (Atlanta's perimeter)—east of I-75.

Additionally, there are three business routes of I-75 in the state. The first I-75 Business Loop (I-75 BL) runs through central Valdosta mostly concurrent with US 221. The second I-75 BL runs through downtown Tifton mostly concurrent with US 41, and a third one that runs through Cordele. There was a former I-75 BL in Adel–Sparks.

See also

References

External links

I-75 at the Interstate Guide

 Georgia
75
Transportation in Lowndes County, Georgia
Transportation in Cook County, Georgia
Transportation in Tift County, Georgia
Transportation in Turner County, Georgia
Transportation in Crisp County, Georgia
Transportation in Dooly County, Georgia
Transportation in Houston County, Georgia
Transportation in Peach County, Georgia
Transportation in Crawford County, Georgia
Transportation in Bibb County, Georgia
Transportation in Macon, Georgia
Transportation in Monroe County, Georgia
Transportation in Lamar County, Georgia
Transportation in Butts County, Georgia
Transportation in Spalding County, Georgia
Transportation in Henry County, Georgia
Transportation in Clayton County, Georgia
Transportation in Fulton County, Georgia
Roads in Atlanta
Transportation in Cobb County, Georgia
Transportation in Cherokee County, Georgia
Transportation in Bartow County, Georgia
Transportation in Gordon County, Georgia
Transportation in Whitfield County, Georgia
Transportation in Catoosa County, Georgia